Argha is a village in Sheshtaraz Rural District, Sheshtaraz District, Khalilabad County, Razavi Khorasan Province, Iran. At the 2006 census, its population was 2,519, in 673 families.

See also 

 List of cities, towns and villages in Razavi Khorasan Province

References 

Populated places in Khalilabad County